Show Me Your Way is the forty-eighth album by American singer/guitarist Glen Campbell, released in 1991 (see 1991 in music).

Track listing

 "The Greatest Gift of All" (T.J. Kuenster) (duet with Russ Taff) – 4:41
 "Jesus and Me" (Phil Driscoll, Lari Goss) – 2:56
 "Where I Am Going" (Jimmy Webb) – 4:09
 "The Wayward Son" (Geoff Thurman, Jamie Page) – 4:12
 "Unto the Least of These" (Phillip Sandifer, Bob Bennett) – 4:06
 "Show Me Your Way" (Craig Fall) (duet with Anne Murray) – 3:18
 "The Savior I Sing of Today" (Jerry Crutchfield) – 2:57
 "A Few Good Men" (Steve Hardin) – 3:51
 "Where Shadows Never Fall" (Carl Jackson, Jim Weatherly) (duet with Kelly Nelon Thompson) – 3:00
 "The Four Horsemen" (Jimmy Webb) – 5:05

Personnel
Glen Campbell – vocals, acoustic guitar
Tom Hemby – acoustic guitar
Shane Keister – keyboards
Phil Nash – keyboards
Dann Huff – electric guitar
Paul Leim – drums
Gary Lunn – bass guitar
David Hungate – bass guitar
Farrell Morris – percussion
Carl Morris – synthesizer
 Wendy Suit Johnson, Lisa Silver, Bergen White, Geoff Thurman, Chris Harris, Christ Church Choir, Chris Rodriguez – background vocals
The "A" Strings – strings

Production
Executive producer – Bill Gaither
Producers –  Jonathan David Brown, Ken Harding, Bergen White
Recorded by Jonathan David Brown
Arranged by Bergen White
Photography – Peter Nash
Art direction – Larry Newlon/Powell Creative Group
Assistant engineers – Patrick Kelly, Todd Robbins

Charts
Album – Billboard (United States)

Singles – CCM charts (United States)

Awards
"Where Shadows Never Fall" won a Dove Award for Best Southern Gospel Song in 1991.

References

Glen Campbell albums
1991 albums